The United States competed at the 1968 Summer Olympics in Mexico City. 357 competitors, 274 men and 83 women, took part in 167 events in 18 sports.

Medalists

Gold
 Jim Hines — Athletics, Men's 100 metres
 Tommie Smith — Athletics, Men's 200 metres
 Lee Evans — Athletics, Men's 400 metres
 Willie Davenport — Athletics, Men's 110 m Hurdles
 Charles Greene, Jim Hines, Mel Pender, and Ronnie Ray Smith — Athletics, Men's 4 × 100 m Relay
 Lee Evans, Ron Freeman, Larry James, and Vincent Matthews — Athletics, Men's 4 × 400 m Relay
 Dick Fosbury — Athletics, Men's High Jump
 Bob Seagren — Athletics, Men's Pole Vault
 Bob Beamon — Athletics, Men's Long Jump
 Randy Matson — Athletics, Men's Shot Put
 Al Oerter — Athletics, Men's Discus Throw
 Bill Toomey — Athletics, Men's Decathlon
 Wyomia Tyus — Athletics, Women's 100 metres
 Madeline Manning — Athletics, Women's 800 metres
 Margaret Bailes, Barbara Ferrell, Mildrette Netter, and Wyomia Tyus — Athletics, Women's 4 × 100 m Relay
 Michael Barrett, John Clawson, Donald Dee, Calvin Fowler, Spencer Haywood, Wilmer Hosket, James King, Glynn Saulters, Charles Scott, Michael Silliman, Kenneth Spain, and Jo Jo White — Basketball, Men's Team Competition
 Ronald Harris — Boxing, Men's Lightweight
 George Foreman — Boxing, Men's Heavyweight
 Bernie Wrightson — Diving, Men's Springboard
 Sue Gossick — Diving, Women's Springboard
 William Steinkraus — Equestrian, Jumping Individual
 Gary Anderson — Shooting, Men's Free Rifle, Three Positions
 Mike Burton — Swimming, Men's 400 m Freestyle
 Mike Burton — Swimming, Men's 1500 m Freestyle
 Don McKenzie — Swimming, Men's 100 m Breaststroke
 Doug Russell — Swimming, Men's 100 m Butterfly
 Carl Robie — Swimming, Men's 200 m Butterfly
 Charlie Hickcox — Swimming, Men's 200 m Individual Medley
 Charlie Hickcox — Swimming, Men's 400 m Individual Medley
 Stephen Rerych, Mark Spitz, Ken Walsh, and Zac Zorn — Swimming, Men's 4 × 100 m Freestyle
 John Nelson, Stephen Rerych, Don Schollander, and Mark Spitz — Swimming, Men's 4 × 200 m Freestyle
 Charlie Hickcox, Don McKenzie, Doug Russell, and Ken Walsh — Swimming, Men's 4 × 100 m Medley Relay
 Jan Henne — Swimming, Women's 100 m Freestyle
 Debbie Meyer — Swimming, Women's 200 m Freestyle
 Debbie Meyer — Swimming, Women's 400 m Freestyle
 Debbie Meyer — Swimming, Women's 800 m Freestyle
 Kaye Hall — Swimming, Women's 100 m Backstroke
 Lillian Watson — Swimming, Women's 200 m Backstroke
 Sharon Wichman — Swimming, Women's 200 m Breaststroke
 Claudia Kolb — Swimming, Women's 200 m Individual Medley
 Claudia Kolb — Swimming, Women's 400 m Individual Medley
 Jane Barkman, Linda Gustavson, Jan Henne, and Susan Pedersen — Swimming, Women's 4 × 100 m Freestyle Relay
 Catie Ball, Ellie Daniel, Kaye Hall, and Susan Pedersen — Swimming, Women's 4 × 100 m Medley Relay
 Peter Barrett and Lowell North — Sailing, Men's Star
 George Friedrichs, Barton Jahncke, and Gerald Schreck — Sailing, Men's Dragon

Silver
 Larry James — Athletics, Men's 400 metres
 Jim Ryun — Athletics, Men's 1500 metres
 Ervin Hall — Athletics, Men's 110 m Hurdles
 Edward Caruthers — Athletics, Men's High Jump
 George Woods — Athletics, Men's Shot Put
 Barbara Ferrell — Athletics, Women's 100 metres
 Albert Robinson — Boxing, Men's Featherweight
 Michael Page, Michael Plumb, and James Wofford — Equestrian, Three-Day Event Team
 Larry Hough and Tony Johnson — Rowing, Men's Coxless Pairs
 John Writer — Shooting, Men's Small-bore Rifle, Three Positions
 Thomas Garrigus — Shooting, Men's Trap Shooting
 Ken Walsh — Swimming, Men's 100 m Freestyle
 Don Schollander — Swimming, Men's 200 m Freestyle
 John Kinsella — Swimming, Men's 1500 m Freestyle
 Charlie Hickcox — Swimming, Men's 100 m Backstroke
 Mitch Ivey — Swimming, Men's 200 m Backstroke
 Mark Spitz — Swimming, Men's 100 m Butterfly
 Greg Buckingham — Swimming, Men's 200 m Individual Medley
 Gary Hall — Swimming, Men's 400 m Individual Medley
 Susan Pedersen — Swimming, Women's 100 m Freestyle
 Jan Henne — Swimming, Women's 200 m Freestyle
 Linda Gustavson — Swimming, Women's 400 m Freestyle
 Pam Kruse — Swimming, Women's 800 m Freestyle
 Ellie Daniel — Swimming, Women's 100 m Butterfly
 Susan Pedersen — Swimming, Women's 200 m Individual Medley
 Lynn Vidali — Swimming, Women's 400 m Individual Medley
 Richard Sanders — Wrestling, Men's Freestyle Flyweight
 Donald Behm — Wrestling, Men's Freestyle Bantamweight

Bronze
 Charles Greene — Athletics, Men's 100 metres
 John Carlos — Athletics, Men's 200 metres
 Ron Freeman — Athletics, Men's 400 metres
 Tom Farrell — Athletics, Men's 800 metres
 George Young — Athletics, Men's 3000 m Steeplechase
 Larry Young — Athletics, Men's 50 km Walk
 Ralph Boston — Athletics, Men's Long Jump
 Harlan Marbley — Boxing, Men's Light Flyweight
 James Wallington — Boxing, Men's Light Welterweight
 John Lee Baldwin — Boxing, Men's Light Middleweight
 Alfred Jones — Boxing, Men's Middleweight
 James Henry — Diving, Men's Springboard
 Keala O'Sullivan — Diving, Women's Springboard
 Edwin Young — Diving, Men's Platform
 Ann Peterson — Diving, Women's Platform
 Michael Page — Equestrian, Three-Day Event Individual
 William Maher and John Nunn — Rowing, Men's Double Sculls
 Mark Spitz — Swimming, Men's 100 m Freestyle
 John Nelson — Swimming, Men's 200 m Freestyle
Ronald Mills — Swimming, Men's 100 m Backstroke
 Jack Horsley — Swimming, Men's 200 m Backstroke
 Brian Job — Swimming, Men's 200 m Breaststroke
 Ross Wales — Swimming, Men's 100 m Butterfly
 John Ferris — Swimming, Men's 200 m Butterfly
 John Ferris — Swimming, Men's 200 m Individual Medley
 Linda Gustavson — Swimming, Women's 100 m Freestyle
 Jane Barkman — Swimming, Women's 200 m Freestyle
 Jane Swagerty — Swimming, Women's 100 m Backstroke
 Kaye Hall — Swimming, Women's 200 m Backstroke
 Sharon Wichman — Swimming, Women's 100 m Breaststroke
 Susan Shields — Swimming, Women's 100 m Butterfly
 Ellie Daniel — Swimming, Women's 200 m Butterfly
 Jan Henne — Swimming, Women's 200 m Individual Medley
 Joseph Dube — Weightlifting, Men's Heavyweight

Athletics

Men's Competition
Men's 100 meters 
Jim Hines
Charles Greene
Mel Pender

Men's 200 meters 
Tommie Smith
John Carlos
Larry Questad

Men's 400 meters 
Lee Evans
Larry James
Ron Freeman
 
Men's 800 meters 
Wade Bell
Tom Farrell
Ronald Kutchinski

Men's 1.500 meters 
Jim Ryun
Marty Liquori
Tom Von Ruden

Men's 5,000 meters 
Jack Bacheler
Bob Day
Lou Scott

Men's 10,000 meters 
Tom Laris
Van Nelson
Tracy Smith

Men's Marathon 
George Young
Ronald Daws
Kenny Moore

Men's 110 meter Hurdles 
Willie Davenport
Ervin Hall
Leon Coleman

Men's 400 meter Hurdles 
Ron Whitney
Boyd Gittins
Geoff Vanderstock

Men's 3,000 meter Steeplechase 
Conrad Nightingale
William Reilly
George Young

Men's 4 × 100 m Relay 
Charles Greene, Mel Pender, Ronnie Ray Smith, and Jim Hines

Men's 4 × 400 m Relay 
Vincent Matthews, Ron Freeman, Larry James, and Lee Evans

Men's 20 km Walk 
Ron Laird
Tom Dooley
Rudy Haluza

Men's 50 km Walk 
David Romansky
Goetz Klopfer
Larry Young
  
Men's Long Jump 
Bob Beamon
Ralph Boston
Charles Mays
 
Men's Triple Jump 
Norman Tate
Art Walker
David Smith

Men's High Jump 
Dick Fosbury
Reynaldo Brown
Edward Caruthers
  
Men's Pole Vault 
Robert Seagren
John Pennel
Casey Carrigan
 
Men's Shot Put 
Randy Matson
Dave Maggard
George Woods

Men's Javelin Throw 
Mark Murro
Frank Covelli
Gary Stenlund

Men's Discus Throw 
Al Oerter
Jay Silvester
Gary Carlsen

Men's Hammer Throw
Hal Connolly
Albert Hall
Ed Burke
 
Men's Decathlon 
Bill Toomey
Tom Waddell
Rick Sloan

Women's Competition
Women's 100 meters 
Wyomia Tyus
Margaret Bailes
Barbara Ferrell

Women's 200 meters 
Wyomia Tyus
Margaret Bailes
Barbara Ferrell
 
Women's 400 meters 
Esther Stroy
Lois Ann Drinkwater
Jarvis Scott
 
Women's 800 meters 
Madeline Manning
Doris Brown
Francie Kraker
 
Women's 4 × 100 m Relay 
Wyomia Tyus, Margaret Bailes, Mildred Netter, and Barbara Ferrell

Women's 80m Hurdles 
Patty Van Wolvelaere
Julie Mae Dyer
Mamie Rallins

Women's Long Jump 
Willye White
Martha Watson
 
Women's High Jump 
Estelle Baskerville
Sharon Callahan
Eleanor Montgomery

Women's Shot Put 
Maren Seidler

Women's Javelin Throw
RaNae Bair
Barbara Friedrich

Women's Discus Throw
Olga Connolly
Carol Moseke

Women's Pentathlon
Pat Winslow
Cathy Hamblin

Basketball

Boxing

Canoeing

Cycling

Fifteen cyclists represented the United States in 1968.

Individual road race
 John Howard
 Daniel Butler
 David Chauner
 Wes Wessberg

Team time trial
 John Howard
 Oliver Martin
 John Allis
 Jim Van Boven

Sprint
 Jackie Simes
 Tim Mountford

1000m time trial
 Jackie Simes

Tandem
 Jack Disney
 Charles Pranke

Individual pursuit
 David Brink

Team pursuit
 David Chauner
 Skip Cutting
 Steve Maaranen
 John Vande Velde

Diving

Equestrian

Fencing

20 fencers represented the United States in 1968.

Men's foil
 Larry Anastasi
 Jeffrey Checkes
 Herbert Cohen

Men's team foil
 Herbert Cohen, Albie Axelrod, Uriah Jones, Larry Anastasi, Jeffrey Checkes

Men's épée
 Stephen Netburn
 Paul Pesthy
 David Micahnik

Men's team épée
 Paul Pesthy, Stephen Netburn, David Micahnik, Daniel Cantillon, Robert Beck

Men's sabre
 Alfonso Morales
 Alex Orban
 Anthony Keane

Men's team sabre
 Alex Orban, Alfonso Morales, Anthony Keane, Robert Blum, Thomas Balla

Women's foil
 Jan York-Romary
 Harriet King
 Veronica Smith

Women's team foil
 Harriet King, Veronica Smith, Sally Pechinsky, Maxine Mitchell, Jan York-Romary

Gymnastics

Modern pentathlon

Three pentathletes represented the United States in 1968.

Individual
 James Moore
 Bob Beck
 Tom Lough

Team
 James Moore
 Bob Beck
 Tom Lough

Rowing

Sailing

Shooting

Twelve shooters represented the United States in 1968. Gary Anderson won gold in 300 m rifle, three positions, John Writer won silver in the 50 m rifle, three positions and Thomas Garrigus won silver in the trap.

25 m pistol
 Bill McMillan
 Jim McNally

50 m pistol
 Arnold Vitarbo
 Don Hamilton

300 m rifle, three positions
 Gary Anderson
 John Foster

50 m rifle, three positions
 John Writer
 John Foster

50 m rifle, prone
 Gary Anderson
 Lones Wigger

Trap
 Tom Garrigus
 Ray Stafford

Skeet
 Earl Herring
 Bob Rodale

Swimming

Volleyball

Men's team competition
Round robin
 Defeated Soviet Union (3-2)
 Lost to Czechoslovakia (1-3)
 Defeated Brazil (3-0)
 Lost to Bulgaria (2-3)
 Lost to Poland (0-3)
 Lost to East Germany (0-3)
 Lost to Japan (0-3)
 Defeated Mexico (3-1)
 Defeated Belgium (3-0) → Seventh place

Team roster

John Alstrom
 Mike Bright
 Wink Davenport
 Smitty Duke
 Tom Haine
 Jack Henn
 Butch May
 Danny Patterson
 Larry Rundle
 Jon Stanley
 Rudy Suwara
Pedro Velasco

Head coach: Jim Coleman

Women's team competition
Round robin
 Lost to Japan (0-3)
 Lost to Czechoslovakia (1-3)
 Lost to Poland (0-3)
 Lost to South Korea (1-3)
 Lost to Soviet Union (1-3)
 Lost to Peru (1-3)
 Lost to Mexico (0-3) → 8th and last place

Team roster
 Patti Lucas Bright
 Kathryn Ann Heck
 Fanny Hopeau
 Ninja Jorgensen
 Laurie Lewis
 Miki McFadden
 Marilyn McReavy
 Nancy Owen
 Barbara "Bobbie" Perry
 Mary Perry
 Sharon Peterson
 Jane Ward (captain)
Head coach: Harlan Cohen

Water polo

Team Competition
Preliminary round (group A)
 Defeated Brazil (10:5)
 Defeated Spain (10:7)
 Tied with Cuba (6:6)
 Lost to Hungary (1:5)
 Lost to Soviet Union (3:8)
 Defeated West Germany (7:5)
Classification Matches
5th/8th place: Defeated Netherlands (6:3)
5th/6th place: Defeated East Germany (6:4) → 5th place

Team roster

Anton Van Dorp
Barry Weitzenberg
Bruce Bradley
David Ashleigh
Dean Willeford
Gary Sheerer
John Parker
Ronald Crawford
Russell Webb
Stanley Cole
Steven Barnett

Weightlifting

Wrestling

References

External links
 USA Volleyball
 DatabaseOlympics
 International Medalists

Nations at the 1968 Summer Olympics
1968
Oly